Alaninema is a genus of nematodes belonging to the monotypic family Alaninematidae.

Species:

Alaninema ngata 
Alaninema njoroensis 
Alaninema venmansi

References

Rhabditida
Rhabditida genera